Maitland Football Club, commonly known as Maitland FC, or simply as Maitland, is an Australian semi-professional soccer club based in East Maitland, a suburb of Maitland, New South Wales.

History
In 2014, Maitland FC were premiers in the Northern NSW State League Division 1. The premiership resulted in Maitland being promoted back to the top tier of Northern NSW Football, now known as National Premier Leagues Northern NSW, for the first time since 2002. Maitland capped off a successful 2014 by winning the Grand Final 3–1 against Valentine FC in extra time.

Ben Martin was the highest goal scorer in the league in 2013 with 30 goals. In 2014, he was again the highest goal scorer with 24 goals.

In 2019 Maitland won the Northern NSW NPL premiership qualifying them for the NPL Finals. In the quarter finals they defeated the Tasmanian champions Devonport City. They progressed through the preliminary rounds of the FFA Cup with wins against Swansea, Charlestown City Blues, Boambee Bombers and Hamilton Olympic. This qualified them for the FFA Cup proper where in the Round of 32 they lost 2–0 at home to the A-League club Central Coast Mariners.

In 2021 Maitland added Junior Development Leagues (JDL, formerly SAP) and Women's Premier League (WPL) squads, and has more than doubled in size. In their inaugural season, the WPL Senior squad took out the 2021 Women's State Cup, coached by Keelan Hamilton.

Current squad

FFA Cup results

Honours
National Premier Leagues Northern NSW / Northern NSW Division One
Premiers (3): 1980, 2019, 2022
Champions (1): 1980
Northern NSW State League Division 1 (Tier 2)
Premiers (1): 2014
Champions (1): 2009, 2014

References

External links
 Maitland FC website

1961 establishments in Australia
Association football clubs established in 1961
Soccer clubs in Newcastle, New South Wales